The Dapuka Group is a geological formation in Asia. It dates back to the Middle Jurassic.

Vertebrate fauna

See also
 List of dinosaur-bearing rock formations

References

Geologic groups of Asia
Geologic formations of China
Jurassic System of Asia